Pesticides are substances that are meant to control pests. This includes herbicide, insecticide, nematicide, molluscicide, piscicide, avicide, rodenticide, bactericide, insect repellent, animal repellent, microbicide, fungicide, and lampricide. The most common of these are herbicides, which account for approximately 50% of all pesticide use globally. Most pesticides are intended to serve as plant protection products (also known as crop protection products), which in general, protect plants from weeds, fungi, or insects. As an example, the fungus Alternaria solani is used to combat the aquatic weed Salvinia.

In general, a pesticide is a chemical (such as carbamate) or biological agent (such as a virus, bacterium, or fungus) that deters, incapacitates, kills, or otherwise discourages pests. Target pests can include insects, plant pathogens, weeds, molluscs, birds, mammals, fish, nematodes (roundworms), and microbes that destroy property, cause nuisance, or spread disease, or are disease vectors. Along with these benefits, pesticides also have drawbacks, such as potential toxicity to humans and other species.

Definition

The Food and Agriculture Organization (FAO) has defined pesticide as:
 any substance or mixture of substances intended for preventing, destroying, or controlling any pest, including vectors of human or animal disease, unwanted species of plants or animals, causing harm during or otherwise interfering with the production, processing, storage, transport, or marketing of food, agricultural commodities, wood and wood products or animal feedstuffs, or substances that may be administered to animals for the control of insects, arachnids, or other pests in or on their bodies. The term includes substances intended for use as a plant growth regulator, defoliant, desiccant, or agent for thinning fruit or preventing the premature fall of fruit. Also used as substances applied to crops either before or after harvest to protect the commodity from deterioration during storage and transport.

Pesticides can be classified by target organism (e.g., herbicides, insecticides, fungicides, rodenticides, and pediculicides – see table), chemical structure (e.g., organic, inorganic, synthetic, or biological (biopesticide), although the distinction can sometimes blur), and physical state (e.g. gaseous (fumigant)). Biopesticides include microbial pesticides and biochemical pesticides. Plant-derived pesticides, or "botanicals", have been developing quickly. These include the pyrethroids, rotenoids, nicotinoids, and a fourth group that includes strychnine and scilliroside.

Many pesticides can be grouped into chemical families. Prominent insecticide families include organochlorines, organophosphates, and carbamates. Organochlorine hydrocarbons (e.g., DDT) could be separated into dichlorodiphenyl ethanes, cyclodiene compounds, and other related compounds. They operate by disrupting the sodium/potassium balance of the nerve fiber, forcing the nerve to transmit continuously. Their toxicities vary greatly, but they have been phased out because of their persistence and potential to bioaccumulate. Organophosphate and carbamates largely replaced organochlorines. Both operate through inhibiting the enzyme acetylcholinesterase, allowing acetylcholine to transfer nerve impulses indefinitely and causing a variety of symptoms such as weakness or paralysis. Organophosphates are quite toxic to vertebrates and have in some cases been replaced by less toxic carbamates. Thiocarbamate and dithiocarbamates are subclasses of carbamates. Prominent families of herbicides include phenoxy and benzoic acid herbicides (e.g. 2,4-D), triazines (e.g., atrazine), ureas (e.g., diuron), and Chloroacetanilide (e.g., alachlor). Phenoxy compounds tend to selectively kill broad-leaf weeds rather than grasses. The phenoxy and benzoic acid herbicides function similar to plant growth hormones, and grow cells without normal cell division, crushing the plant's nutrient transport system. Triazines interfere with photosynthesis. Many commonly used pesticides are not included in these families, including glyphosate.

The application of pest control agents is usually carried out by dispersing the chemical in an (often hydrocarbon-based) solvent-surfactant system to give a homogeneous preparation. A virus lethality study performed in 1977 demonstrated that a particular pesticide did not increase the lethality of the virus. Combinations that included surfactants and the solvent clearly showed that pretreatment with them markedly increased the viral lethality in the test mice.

Pesticides can be classified based upon their biological mechanism function or application method. Most pesticides work by poisoning pests. A systemic pesticide moves inside a plant following absorption by the plant. With insecticides and most fungicides, this movement is usually upward (through the xylem) and outward. Increased efficiency may be a result. Systemic insecticides, which poison pollen and nectar in the flowers, may kill bees and other needed pollinators.

In 2010, the development of a new class of fungicides called paldoxins was announced. These work by taking advantage of natural defense chemicals released by plants called phytoalexins, which fungi then detoxify using enzymes. The paldoxins inhibit the fungi's detoxification enzymes. They are believed to be safer and greener.

History 
Since before 2000 BC, humans have utilized pesticides to protect their crops. The first known pesticide was elemental sulfur dusting used in ancient Sumer about 4,500 years ago in ancient Mesopotamia. By the 15th century, toxic chemicals such as arsenic, mercury, and lead were being applied to crops to kill pests. In the 17th century, nicotine sulfate was extracted from tobacco leaves for use as an insecticide. The 19th century saw the introduction of two more natural pesticides, pyrethrum, which is derived from chrysanthemums, and rotenone, which is derived from the roots of tropical vegetables. Until the 1950s, arsenic-based pesticides were dominant. Paul Müller discovered that DDT was a very effective insecticide. Chlorinates such as DDT were dominant, but they were replaced in the U.S. by organophosphates and carbamates by 1975. Since then, pyrethrin compounds have become the dominant insecticide. Herbicides became common in the 1960s, led by "triazine and other nitrogen-based compounds, carboxylic acids such as 2,4-dichlorophenoxyacetic acid, and glyphosate".

The first legislation providing federal authority for regulating pesticides was enacted in 1910. During the 1940s, manufacturers produced large amounts of synthetic pesticides and their use became widespread. Before the first World War, Germany was the world's leading chemical industry and exported most of the dyes and other chemicals that were used in the United States. War implemented tariffs that stimulated the growth of the chemical industry in the U.S., which made chemistry a prestigious occupation as this industry expanded and became profitable. Money and ideas flowed back from Europe after the U.S. entered WWI, changing the way Americans interacted with themselves and nature, and the industrialization of war hastened the industrialization of pest control. Some sources consider the 1940s and 1950s to have been the start of the "pesticide era." Although the U.S. Environmental Protection Agency was established in 1970 and amendments to the pesticide law in 1972, pesticide use has increased 50-fold since 1950 and 2.3 million tonnes (2.5 million short tons) of industrial pesticides are now used each year. Seventy-five percent of all pesticides in the world are used in developed countries, but use in developing countries is increasing. A study of USA pesticide use trends through 1997 was published in 2003 by the National Science Foundation's Center for Integrated Pest Management.

In the 1960s, it was discovered that DDT was preventing many fish-eating birds from reproducing, which was a serious threat to biodiversity. Rachel Carson wrote the best-selling book Silent Spring about biological magnification. The agricultural use of DDT is now banned under the Stockholm Convention on Persistent Organic Pollutants, but it is still used in some developing nations to prevent malaria and other tropical diseases by spraying on interior walls to kill or repel mosquitoes.

Development 

Available pesticides are not sufficient and new developments are needed. Continued research into the basic biology of pests may identify new vulnerabilities and produce new pesticides; it may also yield pesticides with better financial and environmental characteristics than those presently used. Plant-derived pesticides, or "botanicals", have been developing quickly. These include the pyrethroids, rotenoids, nicotinoids, and a fourth group that includes strychnine and scilliroside. In 2010, the development of a new class of fungicides called paldoxins was announced. These work by taking advantage of natural defense chemicals released by plants called phytoalexins, which fungi then detoxify using enzymes. The paldoxins inhibit the fungi's detoxification enzymes. They are believed to be safer and greener.

Fungicide resistance is increasing the proportion of inactive enantiomers in fungicide applications: The evolution of resistance necessitates research and discovery of new active ingredients, which trends away from already-discovered classes and toward more complex chemical structures. These tend to have more chiral centers more often which means more off products during synthesis.

Insecticide development is being discouraged and slowed down by public sentiment surrounding the worldwide colony collapse disorder crisis. Although CCD is a serious problem, there are indications that other facts are involved, especially Cox-Foster et al. 2007's discovery that a virus is substantially to blame. (See also.) Public concern has risen  irrespective of the facts, and based instead on emotion  and agrochemical research companies face a challenge of image and perception. Partnering with agricultural extensions could help to remedy some of that and get pesticide research back on track.

Uses
Pesticides are used to control organisms that are considered to be harmful, or pernicious to their surroundings. For example, they are used to kill mosquitoes that can transmit potentially deadly diseases like West Nile virus, yellow fever, and malaria. They can also kill bees, wasps or ants that can cause allergic reactions. Insecticides can protect animals from illnesses that can be caused by parasites such as fleas. Pesticides can prevent sickness in humans that could be caused by moldy food or diseased produce. Herbicides can be used to clear roadside weeds, trees, and brush. They can also kill invasive weeds that may cause environmental damage. Herbicides are commonly applied in ponds and lakes to control algae and plants such as water grasses that can interfere with activities like swimming and fishing and cause the water to look or smell unpleasant. Uncontrolled pests such as termites and mold can damage structures such as houses. Pesticides are used in grocery stores and food storage facilities to manage rodents and insects that infest food such as grain. Each use of a pesticide carries some associated risk. Proper pesticide use decreases these associated risks to a level deemed acceptable by pesticide regulatory agencies such as the United States Environmental Protection Agency (EPA) and the Pest Management Regulatory Agency (PMRA) of Canada.

DDT, sprayed on the walls of houses, is an organochlorine that has been used to fight malaria since the 1950s. Recent policy statements by the World Health Organization have given stronger support to this approach. It and other organochlorine pesticides have been banned in most countries worldwide because of their persistence in the environment and human toxicity. DDT use is not always effective, as resistance to DDT was identified in Africa as early as 1955, and by 1972 nineteen species of mosquito worldwide were resistant to DDT.

Amount used
The state of California alone used 117 million pounds. Pesticides are also found in majority of U.S. households with 88 million out of the 121.1 million households indicating that they use some form of pesticide in 2012. As of 2007, there were more than 1,055 active ingredients registered as pesticides, which yield over 20,000 pesticide products that are marketed in the United States.

The US used some 1 kg (2.2 pounds) per hectare of arable land compared with: 4.7 kg in China, 1.3 kg in the UK, 0.1 kg in Cameroon, 5.9 kg in Japan and 2.5 kg in Italy. Insecticide use in the US has declined by more than half since 1980 (0.6%/yr), mostly due to the near phase-out of organophosphates. In corn fields, the decline was even steeper, due to the switchover to transgenic Bt corn.

For the global market of crop protection products, market analysts forecast revenues of over 52 billion US$ in 2019.

Benefits
Pesticides can save farmers' money by preventing crop losses to insects and other pests; in the U.S., farmers get an estimated fourfold return on money they spend on pesticides. One study found that not using pesticides reduced crop yields by about 10%. Another study, conducted in 1999, found that a ban on pesticides in the United States may result in a rise of food prices, loss of jobs, and an increase in world hunger.

There are two levels of benefits for pesticide use, primary and secondary. Primary benefits are direct gains from the use of pesticides and secondary benefits are effects that are more long-term.

Biological
Controlling pests and plant disease vectors
Improved crop yields
Improved crop/livestock quality
Invasive species controlled

Controlling human/livestock disease vectors and nuisance organisms
Human lives saved and disease reduced. Diseases controlled include malaria, with millions of lives having been saved or enhanced with the use of DDT alone.
Animal lives saved and disease reduced

Controlling organisms that harm other human activities and structures
Drivers view unobstructed
Tree/brush/leaf hazards prevented
Wooden structures protected

Monetary
In one study, it was estimated that for every dollar ($1) that is spent on pesticides for crops can yield up to four dollars ($4) in crops saved. This means based that, on the amount of money spent per year on pesticides, $10 billion, there is an additional $40 billion savings in crop that would be lost due to damage by insects and weeds. In general, farmers benefit from having an increase in crop yield and from being able to grow a variety of crops throughout the year. Consumers of agricultural products also benefit from being able to afford the vast quantities of produce available year-round.

Post- WWII conditions caused the pesticide industry to flourish for several reasons including the growing middle class and the invention of cheap tractor-drawn spraying equipment. By the 1980s the demand for pesticides had dropped due to farmers struggling financially and the market for chemicals becoming oversaturated. There were also new costs for producing pesticides due to the strict EPA laws surrounding the chemicals. The modern pesticide market is seven billion dollars and is growing 4% per year due to the invention of the lawn and the stigma surrounding the untamed yard.

Costs
On the cost side of pesticide use there can be costs to the environment, costs to human health, as well as costs of the development and research of new pesticides.

Health effects

Pesticides may cause acute and delayed health effects in people who are exposed. Pesticide exposure can cause a variety of adverse health effects, ranging from simple irritation of the skin and eyes to more severe effects such as affecting the nervous system, hearing, mimicking hormones causing reproductive problems, and also causing cancer. A 2007 systematic review found that "most studies on non-Hodgkin lymphoma and leukemia showed positive associations with pesticide exposure" and thus concluded that cosmetic use of pesticides should be decreased. There is substantial evidence of associations between organophosphate insecticide exposures and neurobehavioral alterations. Limited evidence also exists for other negative outcomes from pesticide exposure including neurological, birth defects, and fetal death.

The American Academy of Pediatrics recommends limiting exposure of children to pesticides and using safer alternatives:

Owing to inadequate regulation and safety precautions, 99% of pesticide-related deaths occur in developing countries that account for only 25% of pesticide usage.

One study found pesticide self-poisoning the method of choice in one third of suicides worldwide, and recommended, among other things, more restrictions on the types of pesticides that are most harmful to humans.

A 2014 epidemiological review found associations between autism and exposure to certain pesticides, but noted that the available evidence was insufficient to conclude that the relationship was causal.

Occupational exposure among agricultural workers 
The World Health Organization and the UN Environment Programme estimate that 3 million agricultural workers in the developing world experience severe poisoning from pesticides each year, resulting in 18,000 deaths. According to one study, as many as 25 million workers in developing countries may suffer mild pesticide poisoning yearly. Other occupational exposures besides agricultural workers, including pet groomers,  groundskeepers, and fumigators, may also put individuals at risk of health effects from pesticides.

Pesticide use is widespread in Latin America, as around US$3 billion are spent each year in the region. Records indicate an increase in the frequency of pesticide poisonings over the past two decades. The most common incidents of pesticide poisoning is thought to result from exposure to organophosphate and carbamate insecticides. At-home pesticide use, use of unregulated products, and the role of undocumented workers within the agricultural industry makes characterizing true pesticide exposure a challenge. It is estimated that 50–80% of pesticide poisoning cases are unreported.

Underreporting of pesticide poisoning is especially common in areas where agricultural workers are less likely to seek care from a healthcare facility that may be monitoring or tracking the incidence of acute poisoning. The extent of unintentional pesticide poisoning may be much greater than available data suggest, particularly among developing countries. Globally, agriculture and food production remain one of the largest industries. In East Africa, the agricultural industry represents one of the largest sectors of the economy, with nearly 80% of its population relying on agriculture for income. Farmers in these communities rely on pesticide products to maintain high crop yields.

Some East Africa governments are shifting to corporate farming, and opportunities for foreign conglomerates to operate commercial farms have led to more accessible research on pesticide use and exposure among workers. In other areas where large proportions of the population rely on subsistence, small-scale farming, estimating pesticide use and exposure is more difficult.

Pesticide poisoning 

Pesticides may exhibit toxic effects on humans and other non-target species, the severity of which depends on the frequency and magnitude of exposure. Toxicity also depends on the rate of absorption, distribution within the body, metabolism, and elimination of compounds from the body. Commonly used pesticides like organophosphates and carbamates act by inhibiting acetylcholinesterase activity, which prevents the breakdown of acetylcholine at the neural synapse. Excess acetylcholine can lead to symptoms like muscle cramps or tremors, confusion, dizziness and nausea. Studies show that farm workers in Ethiopia, Kenya, and Zimbabwe have decreased concentrations of plasma acetylcholinesterase, the enzyme responsible for breaking down acetylcholine acting on synapses throughout the nervous system. Other studies in Ethiopia have observed reduced respiratory function among farm workers who spray crops with pesticides. Numerous exposure pathways for farm workers increase the risk of pesticide poisoning, including dermal absorption walking through fields and applying products, as well as inhalation exposure.

Measuring exposure to pesticides 
There are multiple approaches to measuring a person's exposure to pesticides, each of which provides an estimate of an individual's internal dose. Two broad approaches include measuring biomarkers and markers of biological effect. The former involves taking direct measurement of the parent compound or its metabolites in various types of media: urine, blood, serum. Biomarkers may include a direct measurement of the compound in the body before it's been biotransformed during metabolism. Other suitable biomarkers may include the metabolites of the parent compound after they've been biotransformed during metabolism. Toxicokinetic data can provide more detailed information on how quickly the compound is metabolized and eliminated from the body, and provide insights into the timing of exposure.

Markers of biological effect provide an estimation of exposure based on cellular activities related to the mechanism of action. For example, many studies investigating exposure to pesticides often involve the quantification of the acetylcholinesterase enzyme at the neural synapse to determine the magnitude of the inhibitory effect of organophosphate and carbamate pesticides.

Another method of quantifying exposure involves measuring, at the molecular level, the amount of pesticide interacting with the site of action. These methods are more commonly used for occupational exposures where the mechanism of action is better understood, as described by WHO guidelines published in "Biological Monitoring of Chemical Exposure in the Workplace".  Better understanding of how pesticides elicit their toxic effects is needed before this method of exposure assessment can be applied to occupational exposure of agricultural workers.

Alternative methods to assess exposure include questionnaires to discern from participants whether they are experiencing symptoms associated with pesticide poisoning. Self-reported symptoms may include headaches, dizziness, nausea, joint pain, or respiratory symptoms.

Challenges in assessing pesticide exposure 
Multiple challenges exist in assessing exposure to pesticides in the general population, and many others that are specific to occupational exposures of agricultural workers. Beyond farm workers, estimating exposure to family members and children presents additional challenges, and may occur through "take-home" exposure from pesticide residues collected on clothing or equipment belonging to parent farm workers and inadvertently brought into the home. Children may also be exposed to pesticides prenatally from mothers who are exposed to pesticides during pregnancy. Characterizing children's exposure resulting from drift of airborne and spray application of pesticides is similarly challenging, yet well documented in developing countries. Because of critical development periods of the fetus and newborn children, these non-working populations are more vulnerable to the effects of pesticides, and may be at increased risk of developing neurocognitive effects and impaired development.

While measuring biomarkers or markers of biological effects may provide more accurate estimates of exposure, collecting these data in the field is often impractical and many methods are not sensitive enough to detect low-level concentrations. Rapid cholinesterase test kits exist to collect blood samples in the field. Conducting large scale assessments of agricultural workers in remote regions of developing countries makes the implementation of these kits a challenge. The cholinesterase assay is a useful clinical tool to assess individual exposure and acute toxicity. Considerable variability in baseline enzyme activity among individuals makes it difficult to compare field measurements of cholinesterase activity to a reference dose to determine health risk associated with exposure. Another challenge researchers face in deriving a reference dose is identifying health endpoints that are relevant to exposure. More epidemiological research is needed to identify critical health endpoints, particularly among populations who are occupationally exposed.

Prevention 
Minimizing harmful exposure to pesticides can be achieved by proper use of personal protective equipment, adequate reentry times into recently sprayed areas, and effective product labeling for hazardous substances as per FIFRA regulations. Training high-risk populations, including agricultural workers, on the proper use and storage of pesticides, can reduce the incidence of acute pesticide poisoning and potential chronic health effects associated with exposure.  Continued research into the human toxic health effects of pesticides serves as a basis for relevant policies and enforceable standards that are health protective to all populations.

Environmental effects

Pesticide use raises a number of environmental concerns.Over 98% of sprayed insecticides and 95% of herbicides reach a destination other than their target species, including non-target species, air, water and soil. Pesticide drift occurs when pesticides suspended in the air as particles are carried by wind to other areas, potentially contaminating them. Pesticides are one of the causes of water pollution, and some pesticides are persistent organic pollutants and contribute to soil and flower (pollen, nectar) contamination. Furthermore, pesticide use can adversely impact neighboring agricultural activity, as pests themselves drift to and harm nearby crops that have no pesticide used on them.

In addition, pesticide use reduces biodiversity, contributes to pollinator decline, destroys habitat (especially for birds), and threatens endangered species. Pests can develop a resistance to the pesticide (pesticide resistance), necessitating a new pesticide. Alternatively a greater dose of the pesticide can be used to counteract the resistance, although this will cause a worsening of the ambient pollution problem.

The Stockholm Convention on Persistent Organic Pollutants, listed 9 of the 12 most dangerous and persistent organic chemicals that were (now mostly obsolete) organochlorine pesticides. Since chlorinated hydrocarbon pesticides dissolve in fats and are not excreted, organisms tend to retain them almost indefinitely. Biological magnification is the process whereby these chlorinated hydrocarbons (pesticides) are more concentrated at each level of the food chain. Among marine animals, pesticide concentrations are higher in carnivorous fishes, and even more so in the fish-eating birds and mammals at the top of the ecological pyramid. Global distillation is the process whereby pesticides are transported from warmer to colder regions of the Earth, in particular the Poles and mountain tops. Pesticides that evaporate into the atmosphere at relatively high temperature can be carried considerable distances (thousands of kilometers) by the wind to an area of lower temperature, where they condense and are carried back to the ground in rain or snow.

In order to reduce negative impacts, it is desirable that pesticides be degradable or at least quickly deactivated in the environment. Such loss of activity or toxicity of pesticides is due to both innate chemical properties of the compounds and environmental processes or conditions. For example, the presence of halogens within a chemical structure often slows down degradation in an aerobic environment. Adsorption to soil may retard pesticide movement, but also may reduce bioavailability to microbial degraders.

Economics

In one study, the human health and environmental costs due to pesticides in the United States was estimated to be $9.6 billion: offset by about $40 billion in increased agricultural production.

Additional costs include the registration process and the cost of purchasing pesticides: which are typically borne by agrichemical companies and farmers respectively. The registration process can take several years to complete (there are 70 different types of field tests) and can cost $50–70 million for a single pesticide. At the beginning of the 21st century, the United States spent approximately $10 billion on pesticides annually.

Resistance

The use of pesticides inherently entails the risk of resistance developing. Various techniques and procedures of pesticide application can slow the development of resistance, as can some natural features of the target population and surrounding environment.

Alternatives
Alternatives to pesticides are available and include methods of cultivation, use of biological pest controls (such as pheromones and microbial pesticides), genetic engineering (mostly of crops), and methods of interfering with insect breeding. Application of composted yard waste has also been used as a way of controlling pests. 

These methods are becoming increasingly popular and often are safer than traditional chemical pesticides. In addition, EPA is registering reduced-risk pesticides in increasing numbers.

Cultivation practices
Cultivation practices include polyculture (growing multiple types of plants), crop rotation, planting crops in areas where the pests that damage them do not live, timing planting according to when pests will be least problematic, and use of trap crops that attract pests away from the real crop. Trap crops have successfully controlled pests in some commercial agricultural systems while reducing pesticide usage. In other systems, trap crops can fail to reduce pest densities at a commercial scale, even when the trap crop works in controlled experiments.

Use of other organisms
Release of other organisms that fight the pest is another example of an alternative to pesticide use. These organisms can include natural predators or parasites of the pests. Biological pesticides based on entomopathogenic fungi, bacteria and viruses causing disease in the pest species can also be used.

Biological control engineering
Interfering with insects' reproduction can be accomplished by sterilizing males of the target species and releasing them, so that they mate with females but do not produce offspring. This technique was first used on the screwworm fly in 1958 and has since been used with the medfly, the tsetse fly, and the gypsy moth. This is a costly and slow approach that only works on some types of insects.

Other
Other alternatives include "laserweeding" – the use of novel agricultural robots for weed control using lasers.

Push pull strategy

The term "push-pull" was established in 1987 as an approach for integrated pest management (IPM). This strategy uses a mixture of behavior-modifying stimuli to manipulate the distribution and abundance of insects. "Push" means the insects are repelled or deterred away from whatever resource is being protected. "Pull" means that certain stimuli (semiochemical stimuli, pheromones, food additives, visual stimuli, genetically altered plants, etc.) are used to attract pests to trap crops where they will be killed. There are numerous different components involved in order to implement a Push-Pull Strategy in IPM.

Many case studies testing the effectiveness of the push-pull approach have been done across the world. The most successful push-pull strategy was developed in Africa for subsistence farming. Another successful case study was performed on the control of Helicoverpa in cotton crops in Australia. In Europe, the Middle East, and the United States, push-pull strategies were successfully used in the controlling of Sitona lineatus in bean fields.

Some advantages of using the push-pull method are less use of chemical or biological materials and better protection against insect habituation to this control method. Some disadvantages of the push-pull strategy are that if there is a lack of appropriate knowledge of the behavioral and chemical ecology of the host-pest interactions then this method becomes unreliable. Furthermore, because the push-pull method is not a very popular method of IPM operational and registration costs are higher.

Effectiveness 
Some evidence shows that alternatives to pesticides can be equally effective as the use of chemicals. A study of Maize fields in northern Florida found that the application of composted yard waste with high carbon to nitrogen ratio to agricultural fields was highly effective at reducing the population of plant-parasitic nematodes and increasing crop yield, with yield increases ranging from 10% to 212%; the observed effects were long-term, often not appearing until the third season of the study. Additional silicon nutrition protects some horticultural crops against fungal diseases almost completely, while insufficient silicon sometimes leads to severe infection even when fungicides are used.

Pesticide resistance is increasing and that may make alternatives more attractive.

Types
Pesticides are often referred to according to the type of pest they control. Pesticides can also be considered as either biodegradable pesticides, which will be broken down by microbes and other living beings into harmless compounds, or persistent pesticides, which may take months or years before they are broken down: it was the persistence of DDT, for example, which led to its accumulation in the food chain and its killing of birds of prey at the top of the food chain. Another way to think about pesticides is to consider those that are chemical pesticides are derived from a common source or production method.

Insecticides
Neonicotinoids are a class of neuro-active insecticides chemically similar to nicotine. Imidacloprid, of the neonicotinoid family, is the most widely used insecticide in the world. In the late 1990s neonicotinoids came under increasing scrutiny over their environmental impact and were linked in a range of studies to adverse ecological effects, including honey-bee colony collapse disorder (CCD) and loss of birds due to a reduction in insect populations. In 2013, the European Union and a few non EU countries restricted the use of certain neonicotinoids.

Organophosphate and carbamate insecticides have a similar mode of action. They affect the nervous system of target pests (and non-target organisms) by disrupting acetylcholinesterase activity, the enzyme that regulates acetylcholine, at nerve synapses. This inhibition causes an increase in synaptic acetylcholine and overstimulation of the parasympathetic nervous system. Many of these insecticides, first developed in the mid 20th century, are very poisonous. Although commonly used in the past, many older chemicals have been removed from the market due to their health and environmental effects (e.g. DDT, chlordane, and toxaphene). Many organophosphates do not persist in the environment.

Pyrethroid insecticides were developed as a synthetic version of the naturally occurring pesticide pyrethrin, which is found in chrysanthemums. They have been modified to increase their stability in the environment. Some synthetic pyrethroids are toxic to the nervous system.

Herbicides 
A number of sulfonylureas have been commercialized for weed control, including: amidosulfuron, flazasulfuron, metsulfuron-methyl, rimsulfuron, sulfometuron-methyl, terbacil, nicosulfuron, and triflusulfuron-methyl. These are broad-spectrum herbicides that kill plants weeds or pests by inhibiting the enzyme acetolactate synthase. In the 1960s, more than  crop protection chemical was typically applied, while sulfonylureates allow as little as 1% as much material to achieve the same effect.

Biopesticides

Biopesticides are certain types of pesticides derived from such natural materials as animals, plants, bacteria, and certain minerals. For example, canola oil and baking soda have pesticidal applications and are considered biopesticides. Biopesticides fall into three major classes:

 Microbial pesticides which consist of bacteria, entomopathogenic fungi or viruses (and sometimes includes the metabolites that bacteria or fungi produce). Entomopathogenic nematodes are also often classed as microbial pesticides, even though they are multi-cellular.
 Biochemical pesticides or herbal pesticides are naturally occurring substances that control (or monitor in the case of pheromones) pests and microbial diseases.
 Plant-incorporated protectants (PIPs) have genetic material from other species incorporated into their genetic material (i.e. GM crops). Their use is controversial, especially in many European countries.

By pest type
Pesticides that are related to the type of pests are:

Further types
The term pesticide also includes these substances:

Defoliants: Cause leaves or other foliage to drop from a plant, usually to facilitate harvest.
Desiccants: Promote drying of living tissues, such as unwanted plant tops.
Insect growth regulators: Disrupt the molting, maturity from pupal stage to adult, or other life processes of insects.
Plant growth regulators: Substances (excluding fertilizers or other plant nutrients) that alter the expected growth, flowering, or reproduction rate of plants.
Soil sterilant: a chemical that temporarily or permanently prevents the growth of all plants and animals, depending on the chemical.  Soil sterilants must be registered as pesticides.
Wood preservatives: They are used to make wood resistant to insects, fungus, and other pests.
Gene drives, a complex genetic mechanism which can be embedded into the genetic material of the target species itself. Instead of killing the target individual it can, kill, eliminate the reproduction of, or suppress the reproductive rate of its descendants. This changes the target population in a more pervasive way and has few or no off-target effects.

Regulation

International
In many countries, pesticides must be approved for sale and use by a government agency.

Worldwide, 85% of countries have pesticide legislation for the proper storage of pesticides and 51% include provisions to ensure proper disposal of all obsolete pesticides.

In Europe, EU legislation has been approved banning the use of highly toxic pesticides including those that are carcinogenic, mutagenic or toxic to reproduction, those that are endocrine-disrupting, and those that are persistent, bioaccumulative and toxic (PBT) or very persistent and very bioaccumulative (vPvB) and measures have been approved to improve the general safety of pesticides across all EU member states.

Though pesticide regulations differ from country to country, pesticides, and products on which they were used are traded across international borders. To deal with inconsistencies in regulations among countries, delegates to a conference of the United Nations Food and Agriculture Organization adopted an International Code of Conduct on the Distribution and Use of Pesticides in 1985 to create voluntary standards of pesticide regulation for different countries. The Code was updated in 1998 and 2002. The FAO claims that the code has raised awareness about pesticide hazards and decreased the number of countries without restrictions on pesticide use.

Three other efforts to improve regulation of international pesticide trade are the United Nations London Guidelines for the Exchange of Information on Chemicals in International Trade and the United Nations Codex Alimentarius Commission. The former seeks to implement procedures for ensuring that prior informed consent exists between countries buying and selling pesticides, while the latter seeks to create uniform standards for maximum levels of pesticide residues among participating countries.

Pesticides safety education and pesticide applicator regulation are designed to protect the public from pesticide misuse, but do not eliminate all misuse. Reducing the use of pesticides and choosing less toxic pesticides may reduce risks placed on society and the environment from pesticide use. Integrated pest management, the use of multiple approaches to control pests, is becoming widespread and has been used with success in countries such as Indonesia, China, Bangladesh, the U.S., Australia, and Mexico. IPM attempts to recognize the more widespread impacts of an action on an ecosystem, so that natural balances are not upset. New pesticides are being developed, including biological and botanical derivatives and alternatives that are thought to reduce health and environmental risks. In addition, applicators are being encouraged to consider alternative controls and adopt methods that reduce the use of chemical pesticides.

Pesticides can be created that are targeted to a specific pest's lifecycle, which can be environmentally more friendly. For example, potato cyst nematodes emerge from their protective cysts in response to a chemical excreted by potatoes; they feed on the potatoes and damage the crop. A similar chemical can be applied to fields early before the potatoes are planted, causing the nematodes to emerge early and starve in the absence of potatoes.

United States

In the United States, the Environmental Protection Agency (EPA) is responsible for regulating pesticides under the Federal Insecticide, Fungicide, and Rodenticide Act (FIFRA) and the Food Quality Protection Act (FQPA).

Studies must be conducted to establish the conditions in which the material is safe to use and the effectiveness against the intended pest(s). The EPA regulates pesticides to ensure that these products do not pose adverse effects to humans or the environment, with an emphasis on the health and safety of children. Pesticides produced before November 1984 continue to be reassessed in order to meet the current scientific and regulatory standards. All registered pesticides are reviewed every 15 years to ensure they meet the proper standards. During the registration process, a label is created. The label contains directions for proper use of the material in addition to safety restrictions. Based on acute toxicity, pesticides are assigned to a Toxicity Class. Pesticides are the most thoroughly tested chemicals after drugs in the United States; those used on food require more than 100 tests to determine a range of potential impacts.

Some pesticides are considered too hazardous for sale to the general public and are designated restricted use pesticides. Only certified applicators, who have passed an exam, may purchase or supervise the application of restricted use pesticides. Records of sales and use are required to be maintained and may be audited by government agencies charged with the enforcement of pesticide regulations. These records must be made available to employees and state or territorial environmental regulatory agencies.

In addition to the EPA, the United States Department of Agriculture (USDA) and the United States Food and Drug Administration (FDA) set standards for the level of pesticide residue that is allowed on or in crops. The EPA looks at what the potential human health and environmental effects might be associated with the use of the pesticide.

In addition, the U.S. EPA uses the National Research Council's four-step process for human health risk assessment: (1) Hazard Identification, (2) Dose-Response Assessment, (3) Exposure Assessment, and (4) Risk Characterization.

In 2013 Kaua'i County (Hawai'i) passed Bill No. 2491 to add an article to Chapter 22 of the county's code relating to pesticides and GMOs. The bill strengthens protections of local communities in Kaua'i where many large pesticide companies test their products.

Canada

EU

Residue

Pesticide residue refers to the pesticides that may remain on or in food after they are applied to food crops. The maximum allowable levels of these residues in foods are often stipulated by regulatory bodies in many countries. Regulations such as pre-harvest intervals also often prevent harvest of crop or livestock products if recently treated in order to allow residue concentrations to decrease over time to safe levels before harvest. Exposure of the general population to these residues most commonly occurs through consumption of treated food sources, or being in close contact to areas treated with pesticides such as farms or lawns.

Many of these chemical residues, especially derivatives of chlorinated pesticides, exhibit bioaccumulation which could build up to harmful levels in the body as well as in the environment. The problem is most acute in China, the largest producer of chlorinated pesticids. Persistent chemicals can be magnified through the food chain and have been detected in products ranging from meat, poultry, and fish, to vegetable oils, nuts, and various fruits and vegetables.

Pesticide contamination in the environment can be monitored through bioindicators such as bee pollinators.

There is an ongoing research focused on pesticide residues in farming system.

See also 
 Index of pesticide articles
Environmental hazard
 Pest control
 Pesticide residue
 Pesticide standard value
 WHO Pesticide Evaluation Scheme

References

Bibliography

 Davis, Frederick Rowe. "Pesticides and the perils of synecdoche in the history of science and environmental history." History of Science 57.4 (2019): 469–492.
 Davis, Frederick Rowe. Banned: a history of pesticides and the science of toxicology (Yale UP, 2014).
 Matthews, Graham A. A history of pesticides (CABI, 2018).

External links 

 Pesticides at the World Health Organization (WHO)
 Pesticides at the United Nations Environment Programme (UNEP)
 Pesticides at the European Commission
 Pesticides at the United States Environmental Protection Agency.

Chemical substances
 
Toxic effects of pesticides
Soil contamination
Biocides